Mark of the Lash is a 1948 American Western film starring Lash LaRue and Al "Fuzzy" St. John and directed by Ray Taylor. Produced and co-written by Ron Ormond, the film was shot at the Jack Ingram Movie Ranch.

Plot
Town boss Lance Taggart controls both the law and the water supply of the area using the former to keep the latter.  After Taggart's men kill peace officers sent to investigate him, Marshal Lash Larue and Fuzzy bring Taggart and his gang to justice.

Cast
Lash LaRue 	as U.S. Marshal Lash LaRue
Al St. John 	as Fuzzy Jones (as Fuzzy St. John)
Suzi Crandall 	as Mary Phillips
Jimmy Martin 	as Danny Phillips 
Marshall Reed 	as Lance Taggart
John Cason 	as Colt Jackson
Tom London 	as Lem Kimmerly
Steve Dunhill 	as Jeff
Lee Roberts 	as Ace Talbot
Cliff Taylor 	as Spade

References

External links

1948 films
American Western (genre) films
1948 Western (genre) films
Lippert Pictures films
American black-and-white films
Films directed by Ray Taylor
1940s English-language films
1940s American films